Rafael Natal Diniz Franca is a retired Brazilian mixed martial artist. A professional from 2005 until 2017, he is best known for his 17-fight stint competing for the UFC.

Mixed martial arts career

Background
Natal started Brazilian Jiu-Jitsu and was eventually awarded his black belt by fifth degree black belt Vinicius Magalhães. Natal is also a professor (an instructor) at Renzo Gracie's academy in New York, where he trains with Márcio Cruz.

Natal's professional MMA career began in smaller shows and he compiled a record of 6–0 - which included a victory over Danillo Villefort - before scoring a minor upset victory over Silmar Rodrigo via unanimous decision.

Ring of Combat and Moosin
Natal then joined Ring of Combat and made his promotional debut against Alexandre Moreno at Ring of Combat 23. Natal defeated him via KO in the first round.

This was followed up by a submission win over Plinio Cruz at Ring of Combat 24, before Natal faced Victor O'Donnell at Ring of Combat 25. Natal lost to O'Donnell via doctor stoppage after round 1.

At Ring of Combat 26, Natal was supposed to fight Sean Salmon. However, Salmon had to withdraw and was replaced by Allan Weickert. Weickert was no match for Natal, who picked up the submission victory after a rear naked choke.

Natal then competed in Moosin: God of Martial Arts against The Ultimate Fighter 4 winner Travis Lutter. In a bout dominated by striking, Natal caught Lutter with an uppercut, giving him the KO victory in the first round.

Ultimate Fighting Championship
Natal then reportedly signed a deal with Shine Fights. However, in July 2010, Renzo Gracie announced on his website that Natal had instead signed a four-fight deal with the UFC.

His first opponent was The Ultimate Fighter alumn Rich Attonito at UFC Fight Night: Marquardt vs. Palhares. Natal lost the bout via unanimous decision. Natal was dropped in the first round in the bout with Attonito. He recovered well and even got takedowns but couldn't do enough to win the decision.

Natal was expected to face Jason MacDonald on December 11, 2010 at UFC 124. However, MacDonald would later withdraw and was replaced by newcomer Jesse Bongfeldt. The fight was scored a draw by the judges. Natal won the first two rounds 10–9, but two judges scored the third round 10–8 Bongfeldt leading to the majority draw (two 28–28 scores) after 3 rounds. The scorecards were originally announced as a unanimous 30–30 draw, but when copies of the scorecards were distributed, the mistake was corrected.

Natal was expected to face Alessio Sakara on March 3, 2011 at UFC Live: Sanchez vs. Kampmann but due to injury Natal was replaced by Chris Weidman.

Natal was expected to face Riki Fukuda on August 6, 2011 at UFC 133. However, Fukuda was forced out of the bout due to a knee injury sustained in a car accident  and replaced by Costas Philippou. When Philippou replaced an injured Alessio Sakara to fight Jorge Rivera, Natal faced former The Ultimate Fighter: Team Rampage vs. Team Forrest competitor Paul Bradley instead. Natal defeated Bradley by unanimous decision, winning the first and third rounds on all three judges scorecards. In the fight Natal utilized excellent takedown defense and a constant barrage of low kicks to outpoint his opponent.

Natal faced UFC newcomer Michael Kuiper on February 4, 2012 at UFC 143. He won the fight via unanimous decision.

Natal next face Andrew Craig on July 11, 2012 at UFC on Fuel TV: Munoz vs. Weidman. After nearly finishing Craig, Natal lost via head kick KO with seconds remaining in round two.

Natal was expected to face Magnus Cedenblad on January 26, 2013 at UFC on Fox 6. However, Cedenblad pulled out of the bout citing an injury and was replaced by promotional newcomer Sean Spencer. Natal defeated Spencer via third round submission.

Natal was expected to face Chris Camozzi on May 18, 2013 at UFC on FX 8. However, Camozzi was pulled from the matchup with Natal in favor of a matchup with Ronaldo Souza at the same event after Souza's scheduled opponent Costas Philippou pulled out of the bout with an injury. Natal instead faced promotional newcomer Joao Zeferino. He won the back-and-forth fight via unanimous decision.

Natal faced Tor Troéng on September 4, 2013 at UFC Fight Night 28. He won the fight via unanimous decision.  The bout also earned him his first Fight of the Night bonus award.

Natal was expected to face Ed Herman on November 16, 2013 at UFC 167. However, after Michael Bisping pull out of his fight with Mark Muñoz at UFC Fight Night 30, Tim Kennedy's original opponent Lyoto Machida filled in for Bisping thus giving Natal the spot to face Kennedy at UFC Fight Night 31. He lost the fight via knockout in the first round.

Natal faced Ed Herman on May 10, 2014 at UFC Fight Night 40. He lost the fight via unanimous decision.

A rescheduled bout with Chris Camozzi took place on September 5, 2014 at UFC Fight Night 50. Natal defeated Camozzi via split decision.

Natal next faced Tom Watson on January 31, 2015 at UFC 183. He won the fight by unanimous decision.

Natal faced Uriah Hall on May 23, 2015 at UFC 187. Natal defeated Hall via split decision.

Natal faced Kevin Casey on January 30, 2016 at UFC on Fox 18. He won the fight via TKO in the third round.

Natal faced Robert Whittaker on April 23, 2016 at UFC 197. Natal lost the back and forth fight via unanimous decision.

Natal next faced Tim Boetsch on November 12, 2016 at UFC 205. He lost the fight via TKO in the first round.

Natal was expected to face Alessio Di Chirico on July 22, 2017 at UFC on Fox 25.  However, Di Chirico pulled out in the weeks leading up to the event with a neck injury and was replaced by promotional newcomer Eryk Anders. Natal lost the fight via knockout in the first round.

After Natal retired from professional fighting, he took up the role as the president of Dominance MMA in Brazil.

Retirement 
On October 2, 2017, Natal announced his retirement as a professional MMA fighter, with a record of 21-9-1.

Championships and accomplishments

Ultimate Fighting Championship
Fight of the Night (One time)

Mixed martial arts record

|-
|Loss
|align=center|
|Eryk Anders
|KO (punches)
|UFC on Fox: Weidman vs. Gastelum 
|
|align=center|1
|align=center|2:54
|Uniondale, New York, United States
|
|-
|Loss
|align=center|21–8–1
|Tim Boetsch
|KO (punches)
|UFC 205
|
|align=center|1
|align=center|3:22
|New York City, New York, United States
|  
|-
|Loss
|align=center|21–7–1
|Robert Whittaker
|Decision (unanimous)
|UFC 197
|
|align=center|3
|align=center|5:00
|Las Vegas, Nevada, United States
| 
|-
|Win
|align=center|21–6–1
|Kevin Casey
|TKO (punches)
|UFC on Fox: Johnson vs. Bader
|
|align=center|3
|align=center|3:37
|Newark, New Jersey, United States
|
|-
|Win
|align=center|20–6–1
|Uriah Hall
|Decision (split)
|UFC 187
|
|align=center|3
|align=center|5:00
|Las Vegas, Nevada, United States
|
|-
|Win
|align=center|19–6–1
|Tom Watson
|Decision (unanimous)
|UFC 183
|
|align=center|3
|align=center|5:00
|Las Vegas, Nevada, United States
|
|-
|Win
|align=center|18–6–1
|Chris Camozzi
|Decision (split)
|UFC Fight Night: Jacaré vs. Mousasi
|
|align=center|3
|align=center|5:00
|Mashantucket, Connecticut, United States
|
|-
|Loss
|align=center|17–6–1
|Ed Herman
|Decision (unanimous)
|UFC Fight Night: Brown vs. Silva
|
|align=center|3
|align=center|5:00
|Cincinnati, Ohio, United States
|
|-
|Loss
|align=center|17–5–1
|Tim Kennedy
|KO (punch)
|UFC: Fight for the Troops 3
|
|align=center|1
|align=center|4:40
|Fort Campbell, Kentucky, United States
|
|-
|Win
|align=center|17–4–1
|Tor Troéng
|Decision (unanimous)
|UFC Fight Night: Teixeira vs. Bader
|
|align=center|3
|align=center|5:00
|Belo Horizonte, Brazil
|
|-
|Win
|align=center|16–4–1
|João Zeferino
|Decision (unanimous)
|UFC on FX: Belfort vs. Rockhold
|
|align=center|3
|align=center|5:00
|Jaraguá do Sul, Brazil
|
|-
|Win
|align=center|15–4–1
|Sean Spencer
|Submission (arm-triangle choke)
|UFC on Fox: Johnson vs. Dodson
|
|align=center|3
|align=center|2:13
|Chicago, Illinois, United States
|
|-
|Loss
|align=center|14–4–1
|Andrew Craig 
|KO (head kick)
|UFC on Fuel TV: Munoz vs. Weidman
|
|align=center|2
|align=center|4:52
|San Jose, California, United States
|
|-
|Win
|align=center|14–3–1
|Michael Kuiper 
|Decision (unanimous)
|UFC 143
|
|align=center|3
|align=center|5:00
|Las Vegas, Nevada, United States
|
|-
|Win
|align=center|13–3–1
|Paul Bradley
|Decision (unanimous)
|UFC 133
|
|align=center|3
|align=center|5:00
|Philadelphia, Pennsylvania, United States
| 
|-
|Draw
|align=center|12–3–1
|Jesse Bongfeldt
|Draw (majority)
|UFC 124
|
|align=center|3
|align=center|5:00
|Montreal, Quebec, Canada
|
|-
|Loss
|align=center|12–3
|Rich Attonito
|Decision (unanimous)
|UFC Fight Night: Marquardt vs. Palhares
|
|align=center|3
|align=center|5:00
|Austin, Texas, United States
|
|-
|Win
|align=center|12–2
|Travis Lutter
|KO (punches)
|Moosin: God of Martial Arts
|
|align=center|1
|align=center|4:12
|Worcester, Massachusetts, United States
|
|-
|Win
|align=center|11–2
|Allan Weickert
|Submission (rear-naked choke)
|Ring of Combat 26
|
|align=center|1
|align=center|2:53
|Atlantic City, New Jersey, United States
|
|-
|Loss
|align=center|10–2
|Victor O'Donnell
|TKO (doctor stoppage)
|Ring of Combat 25
|
|align=center|1
|align=center|5:00
|Atlantic City, New Jersey, United States
|
|-
|Win
|align=center|10–1
|Plinio Cruz
|Submission (rear-naked choke)
|Ring of Combat 24
|
|align=center|2
|align=center|3:13
|Atlantic City, New Jersey, United States
|
|-
|Win
|align=center|9–1
|Alexandre Moreno
|KO (punch)
|Ring of Combat 23
|
|align=center|1
|align=center|3:59
|Atlantic City, New Jersey, United States
|
|-
|Win
|align=center|8–1
|Jon Kirk
|Submission (rear-naked choke)
|SWC 2: Battleground
|
|align=center|1
|align=center|3:19
|Frisco, Texas, United States
|
|-
|Loss
|align=center|7–1
|Eduardo Telles
|KO (head kick)
|Fury FC 6: High Voltage
|
|align=center|2
|align=center|2:18
|Rio de Janeiro, Brazil
|
|-
|Win
|align=center|7–0
|Silmar Rodrigo
|Decision (unanimous)
|Mo Team League 1
|
|align=center|3
|align=center|5:00
|São Paulo, Brazil
|
|-
|Win
|align=center|6–0
|Gerson Silva
|Decision
|XFC Brazil
|
|align=center|3
|align=center|5:00
|Rio de Janeiro, Brazil
|
|-
|Win
|align=center|5–0
|Nailson Bahia
|Submission (armbar)
|XFC Brazil
|
|align=center|1
|align=center|1:24
|Rio de Janeiro, Brazil
|
|-
|Win
|align=center|4–0
|Danillo Villefort
|TKO (punches)
|Gold Fighters Championship 1
|
|align=center|1
|align=center|N/A
|Rio de Janeiro, Brazil
|
|-
|Win
|align=center|3–0
|Carlos Eduardo dos Santos
|Submission (guillotine choke)
|Wild Fight 1
|
|align=center|2
|align=center|2:46
|Juiz de Fora, Brazil
|
|-
|Win
|align=center|2–0
|Walter Luis
|Submission (keylock)
|Champions Night 12
|
|align=center|2
|align=center|0:55
|São Paulo, Brazil
|
|-
|Win
|align=center|1–0
|Emerson Avila
|Submission (rear-naked choke)
|Champions Night 12
|
|align=center|1
|align=center|1:58
|São Paulo, Brazil
|

See also
 List of current UFC fighters
 List of male mixed martial artists

References

External links
Official UFC Profile

Brazilian expatriate sportspeople in the United States
Brazilian male mixed martial artists
Sportspeople from Minas Gerais
Ultimate Fighting Championship male fighters
Middleweight mixed martial artists
Mixed martial artists utilizing Brazilian jiu-jitsu
Sportspeople from Belo Horizonte
Brazilian practitioners of Brazilian jiu-jitsu
People awarded a black belt in Brazilian jiu-jitsu
Living people
1982 births